Frederick Vincent Ahern Jr. (born February 12, 1952) is an American former professional ice hockey player who played 146 games in the National Hockey League (NHL) from in 1974 through 1978. A graduate of Bowdoin College, he played for the California Golden Seals, Cleveland Barons and Colorado Rockies, and also represented the United States in the 1976 Canada Cup.

Career statistics

Regular season and playoffs

International

External links 

1952 births
Living people
American expatriate sportspeople in Switzerland
American men's ice hockey right wingers
Baltimore Clippers (1979–81) players
Binghamton Dusters players
Bowdoin Polar Bears men's ice hockey players
California Golden Seals players
Cleveland Barons (NHL) players
Colorado Rockies (NHL) players
Ice hockey people from Boston
Neuchâtel Young Sprinters HC players
Oklahoma City Stars players
Salt Lake Golden Eagles (CHL) players
Undrafted National Hockey League players

Bowdoin College alumni